Willa Zahava Silverman (born 1959) is an American writer.

After undergraduate studies at Harvard, Silverman received her doctorate in French Studies at New York University. She has published works as The Notorious Life of Gyp: Right-Wing Anarchist in Fin-de-Siècle France (1995), an biography of Sibylle Riqueti de Mirabeau —translated into French as Gyp, la dernière des Mirabeau, with a preface by Michel Winock—, and The New Bibliopolis: French Book Collectors and the Culture of Print 1880—1914 (2008).

References

External links 
 
 Willa Z. Silverman in Jewish Studies Program of The Pennsylvania State University.

1959 births
New York University alumni
Harvard University alumni
Living people